Source criticism, in biblical criticism, refers to the attempt to establish the sources used by the authors and redactors of a biblical text. It originated in the 18th century with the work of Jean Astruc, who adapted the methods already developed for investigating the texts of classical antiquity (in particular, Homer's Iliad) to his own investigation into the sources of the Book of Genesis. It was subsequently considerably developed by German scholars in what was known as "the higher criticism", a term no longer in widespread use. The ultimate aim of these scholars was to reconstruct the history of the biblical text and also the religious history of ancient Israel.

Principles 

In general, the closer a source is to the event which it purports to describe, the more one can trust it to give an accurate description of what really happened. In the Bible where a variety of earlier sources have been quoted, the historian seeks to identify and date those sources used by biblical writers as the first step in evaluating their historical reliability.

In other cases, Bible scholars use the way a text is written (changes in style, vocabulary, repetitions, and the like) to determine what sources may have been used by a biblical author. With some reasonable guesswork it is possible to deduce sources not identified as such (e.g., genealogies).  Some inter-biblical sources can be determined by virtue of the fact that the source is still extant, for example, where the Books of Chronicles quotes or retells the accounts of the books of Samuel and Kings.

Tanakh 
Source criticism has been applied to several parts of the Tanakh (the Hebrew Bible or Old Testament).

Documentary hypothesis 

The documentary hypothesis considers the sources for the Pentateuch (the first five books of the Bible), claiming that it derives from four separate sources: the Yahwist, Elohist, Deuteronomist, and Priestly:
 The Jahwist (J) source is characterized by calling God "YHWH", depicts him as human-like, and is especially concerned with the kingdom of Judah. It is thought to have been written c. 950 BCE.
 The Elohist (E) source is characterized by calling God "Elohim", and deals more with the kingdom of Israel. It is thought to have been written c. 850 BCE.
 The Deuteronomic (D) source is characterized by a sermon-like style mostly concerned with law. It is thought to have been written c. 721–621 BCE.
 The Priestly (P) is characterized by a formal style that is mostly concerned with priestly matters. It is thought to have been written c. 550 BCE.

For example, of the two creation stories at the start of Genesis, the first is ascribed to P, while the second (the creation of Adam and Eve in chapter 2) is ascribed to J.

While the documentary hypothesis has widespread support among biblical scholars, other hypotheses such as the "fragmentary" and "supplementary" have also been proposed.

Other cases 
The writers of the Tanakh sometimes mention sources they use. These include Acts of Solomon (1 Kings 11:41), Chronicles of the Kings of Judah (1 Kings 14:29 and in a number of other places), Chronicles of the Kings of Israel (1 Kings 14:19 and in a number of other places), the Book of Jashar (Josh 10:12–14, 2 Sam 1:18–27, and possibly to be restored via textual criticism to 1 Kings 8:12), and Book of the Wars of the Lord (Num 21:14).

A more complicated and speculative form of source criticism results from critical evaluation of style, vocabulary, reduplication, and discrepancies. An example of this kind of source criticism is found in the book of Ezra–Nehemiah (typically treated by biblical scholars as one book) where scholars identify four types of source material: letters to and from Persian officials, lists of things, the Ezra memoir (where Ezra speaks in first person), and the Nehemiah memoir (where Nehemiah speaks in first person). It is thus deduced that the writer of Ezra–Nehemiah had access to these four kinds of source material in putting together his book.

Source criticism also leads many scholars towards redaction of the book of Isaiah from original multiple authorship.

New Testament

In the study of the New Testament, an example of source criticism is the study of the Synoptic problem. Critics noticed that the three Synoptic Gospels, Matthew, Mark and Luke, were very similar, indeed, at times identical. The dominant theory to account for the duplication is called the two-source hypothesis. This suggests that Mark was the first gospel to be written, and that it was probably based on a combination of early oral and written material. Matthew and Luke were written at a later time, and relied primarily on two different sources: Mark and a written collection of Jesus's sayings, which has been given the name Q by scholars. This latter document has now been lost, but at least some of its material can be deduced indirectly, namely through the material that is common in Matthew and Luke but absent in Mark. In addition to Mark and Q, the writers of Matthew and Luke made some use of additional sources, which would account for the material that is unique to each of them.

There is less of a consensus that the writers of the Gospel of John may have used a hypothetical Signs Gospel.

See also
Historical criticism in Bible studies

Further reading

 Viviano, Pauline A. "Source Criticism." To Each Its Own Meaning: An Introduction to Biblical Criticisms and their Application. Steven L. McKenzie and Stephen R. Haynes, eds. Westerville John Knox Press, 1999. pp 35–57.

References

External links
 David Wenham, Source Criticism

Biblical criticism